The Forest Products Tournament was a golf tournament held in New Zealand from 1964 to 1966. The event was hosted by Tokoroa Golf Club in Tokoroa. The 1966 event resulted in a tie between Bob Charles and Tony Jacklin.

Winners

References

Golf tournaments in New Zealand
Recurring sporting events established in 1964
Recurring events disestablished in 1966
1964 establishments in New Zealand
1966 disestablishments in New Zealand